Paukštakiai eldership is an eldership in Plungė District Municipality to the east from Plungė. The administrative center is Grumbliai.

Largest villages 
Staneliai
Grumbliai
Paukštakiai

Other villages

References 

Elderships in Plungė District Municipality